Ronald Holmes (August 26, 1963 – October 27, 2011) was a professional American football defensive end who played eight seasons in the National Football League for the Tampa Bay Buccaneers and the Denver Broncos.

A standout defensive end at the University of Washington in Seattle, Holmes won the Pac-10 Morris Trophy and was named an All-American in 1984.  After leading the Huskies to a victory over Oklahoma in the Orange Bowl, Holmes left the school with the all team record in career sacks (28) and sacks in a game (5). Holmes was selected eighth overall in the 1985 NFL Draft by Tampa Bay.  He spent four years with the Bucs before moving on to Denver in 1989 and playing four seasons for the Broncos.

Holmes ranked second on the Broncos in 1989 with 9 sacks and started in Super Bowl XXIV.  He was considered to have Pro Bowl talent, but his development was slowed by injuries.

Holmes was inducted into the UW Husky Hall of Fame in 2001. At age 48, he died in 2011 in Dupont, Washington.

See also
 Washington Huskies football statistical leaders

References

External links
Sports Press Northwest – Ron Holmes (1963–2011)
 
 

1963 births
2011 deaths
All-American college football players
American football defensive ends
Denver Broncos players
People from Chattahoochee County, Georgia
People from Muscogee County, Georgia
Players of American football from Georgia (U.S. state)
Players of American football from Washington (state)
Tampa Bay Buccaneers players
Washington Huskies football players
Timberline High School (Lacey, Washington) alumni